Blind Horizon is a 2003 American conspiracy mystery thriller film directed by Michael Haussman. The screenplay was co-written by F. Paul Benz and Steve Tomlin. The leading cast includes Val Kilmer, Neve Campbell, Sam Shepard, Amy Smart and Faye Dunaway.

Plot
The film begins in the outskirts of rural New Mexico where an unconscious Frank Kavanaugh (Kilmer) is discovered by two local ranch hands. Suffering from a gunshot wound to the head, he is rushed to a nearby hospital in a small town called Black Point. Due to the extent of his injuries, Kavanaugh is placed in an intensive care unit under the care of a trauma nurse named Liz (Amy Smart). After regaining consciousness, Kavanaugh is interviewed by Sheriff Kolb (Shepard), however, because of his head injuries, he is unable to explain what has transpired due to a case of temporary amnesia. Given his condition, Kavanaugh is ordered to stay in the hospital for closer observation.

Much to their dismay, Sheriff Kolb and his deputies are unable to find any clues as to what might have happened to Kavanaugh. After a thorough search of the crime scene, Sheriff Kolb returns to the hospital to find that Kavanaugh, in a violent and confused state, is claiming to have knowledge of a possible assassination attempt on the president of the United States. Dr. Conway (Gil Bellows) persuades Kavanaugh to remain calm and later explains to Sheriff Kolb that his paranoia stems from a delusional side effect of the amnesia. Amongst the added confusion, Kavanaugh experiences a myriad of images that could be pure fantasy or actual pre-amnesiatic memories. The most vivid image, one in which a dark, shadowy figure is seen talking with a mysterious woman named Ms. K (Dunaway), hints at various details of a possible assassination attempt involving key government parties. However, because of Kavanaugh's deranged state, he is unable to differentiate between reality and fantasy.

Sheriff Kolb believes that there is some credibility to Kavanaugh's story and continues to question him. To further complicate matters for Kavanaugh, his fiancée, Chloe (Campbell), arrives at the hospital and makes arrangements for his immediate release. It is then revealed through Chloe that she and Kavanaugh are actually from Chicago and that Kavanaugh works for the IRS. She produces documentation that verifies Kavanaugh's employment with the government, and further explains to Sheriff Kolb that she and Kavanaugh were in New Mexico on vacation. She also produces a seaside photo of Kavanaugh and herself walking on a beach as further proof that she is his fiancée. Kavanaugh still strongly believes in an imminent attempt on the President's life and later calls the US Secret Service and warns them of an assassination plot that will occur in Black Point within the next few days. Distraught over his situation, Chloe convinces Kavanaugh to leave the hospital with her, and she drives him back to the motel they had checked into a few days earlier. Incidentally, recent news updates reveal that the President and his campaign team have been touring the Southwest and will arrive in New Mexico within the next few days.

As the President arrives and prepares to address the public, Kavanaugh attempts to follow what evidence he has to warn the authorities and avert the assassination. While he views the President from a nearby building, he discovers a set of sniper's equipment, including a rifle, which he instinctively assembles. Taking aim out of the window, he sights the President through the scope of the rifle, and realizes that he, in fact, is the assassin, and that his flashbacks are of all the preparation leading up to the date of the event. He notices another assassin taking aim at the President with his sniper rifle from the other side. Understanding that he has the power to change the course of events, Kavanaugh aims at the other assassin through his scope and shoots him, killing him and averting the assassination.

Cast

External links
 
 

2003 films
2003 action thriller films
2003 psychological thriller films
American action thriller films
American mystery thriller films
American psychological thriller films
Nu Image films
Films about amnesia
Films about assassinations
Films about contract killing
Films produced by Vincent Newman
Films set in New Mexico
American neo-noir films
2000s English-language films
2000s American films